Mickeys can mean:
 Mickey's, a malt liquor from the Miller Brewing Company
 The unit of measurement for how far a mouse has moved since it was last polled.